Marcelo Gomes may refer to:

 Marcelo Gomes (dancer) (born 1979), Brazilian ballet dancer
 Marcelo Gomes (director) (born 1963), Brazilian film director
 Marcelo Gomes (footballer) (born 1981), Brazilian footballer